Maslam may be,

 Maslam language
 Maslam ibn Ahmed al-Majriti